This is a list of Asian Australians who have served as members of Australian federal, state, or territory legislatures. Despite Australia's proximity to Asia, as well as the significant and increasing minority of Australians belonging to an Asian ethnicity, the Australian Parliament is considered to be particularly under-representative of its Asian constituents in comparison to other Western multicultural democracies  with members of minority groups making up only about 6 percent of Parliament.

Classification

Officeholders 
20 Asian Australian people have been members of the Parliament of Australia (the Federal Parliament), including ten each in the Senate and the House of Representatives. The most common represented ethnicity are Chinese Australian (nine) and Indian Australian (three). There are eight incumbent Asian Australian parliamentarians as of 2022.

Federal Parliament

Senate

House of Representatives

State and local government

State Premiers

Governors and Governors-General

Australian Capital Territory Legislative Assembly

Parliament of New South Wales

Parliament of the Northern Territory

Parliament of Queensland

Parliament of South Australia

Parliament of Tasmania

Parliament of Victoria

Parliament of Western Australia

Councilors and Mayors

See also

Asian Australians 
 Asian Australian History
 Asian Immigration to Australia
 List of Asian Australians

Asian Americans 
 Asian Americans in politics
 List of Asian Americans in Politics
 List of Asian Americans and Pacific Islands Americans in the United States Congress

Other 
 List of ethnic minority politicians in the United Kingdom
 List of foreign politicians of Indian origin
 List of politicians of Chinese descent

References

Asian politicians
 
Asian